is a 2011 Japanese anime television special produced by P.A. Works which aired in the Toyama Prefecture of Japan on the local network, KNB, and other networks in February 2011. Toyama Governor Takakazu Ishii revealed the project during a press conference for the 2011 prefectural budget. The series centers on second-grader Mai Tatsumi who use magic to understand her family's feelings. The series was designed to raise public awareness about the importance of family bonds.

Voices included Sumi Shimamoto as the mother, Yuki, and Mami Koyama as Hotaru, the grandmother.

References

External links 
 Mai no Mahō to Katei no Hi official website
 
 Mai no Mahō to Katei no Hi at IMDb.com
 courtesy of Lantis

2011 anime OVAs
P.A.Works
Films about families